Samara Kryazh (also Kryazh) is an air base in Samara Oblast, Russia located 10 km south of Samara. It was the site of the GAZ 1 MiG plant; and is thought to be a missile production site.

References
RussianAirFields.com

Soviet Air Force bases
Russian Air Force bases
Airports built in the Soviet Union
Airports in Samara Oblast
Samara, Russia